Pride (Italian: Orgoglio) is a 1938 Italian drama film directed by Marco Elter and starring Fosco Giachetti, Paola Barbara and Mario Ferrari.

It was shot at the Cinecittà Studios in Rome. The film's sets were designed by the art director Giorgio Pinzauti.

Synopsis
A young Engineer with ambitious plans tries and fails to get support from his traditionalist industrialist father. Only when his son is injured in an unsuccessful experiment does the father change his mind.

Cast
 Fosco Giachetti as Alberto Celoria
 Paola Barbara as Gianna
 Mario Ferrari as Il banchiere castoldi
 Achille Majeroni as Il padre di alberto
 Hesperia
 Nada Fiorelli		
 Mario Besesti	
 Carlo Duse	
 Adolfo Geri

References

Bibliography 
 Poppi, Roberto. I registi: dal 1930 ai giorni nostri. Gremese Editore, 2000.

External links 
 

1938 films
Italian drama films
1938 drama films
1930s Italian-language films
Films directed by Marco Elter
Italian black-and-white films
Films shot at Cinecittà Studios
1930s Italian films